The Great Divergence: China, Europe, and the Making of the Modern World Economy is a 2000 nonfiction book by Kenneth Pomeranz, published by Princeton University Press, on the subject of Great Divergence in the world history.

The book won the John K. Fairbank Prize for 2000. It was a joint winner for World History Association Book Prize of 2000.

References 

2000 non-fiction books
Princeton University Press books
World history
History books